Excursion to the Moon is a 1908 French silent film directed by Segundo de Chomón. The production was supervised by Ferdinand Zecca, designed by V. Lorant-Heilbronn, and released by Pathé Frères. The film is an unauthorized remake, and an almost shot-by-shot copy, of Georges Méliès's 1902 film A Trip to the Moon.

The film follows Méliès's scenario closely and includes many of its features, with some variations: for example, the Selenites are not vulnerable to umbrellas, but rather appear and disappear at will; the capsule lands inside the Man in the Moon's open mouth rather than hitting its eye; and the Selenite who returns to Earth is a "dancing moon-maiden" who is betrothed at the end of the film to one of the astronomers. This film has occasionally been misidentified as a work by Méliès.

Of the film's 180 meters, 72 were colorized using a Pathé stencil process.

References

External links

1908 films
Films directed by Segundo de Chomón
Short film remakes
Films based on works by H. G. Wells
French science fiction films
French silent short films
1900s science fiction films
Articles containing video clips
Georges Méliès
French black-and-white films
Films based on From the Earth to the Moon
1900s French films
Silent science fiction films